Wild Isles is a 2023 British nature documentary presented by Sir David Attenborough. The five-episode series covers the wildlife of the British Isles. Silverback Films was commissioned by the BBC to create the series, with co-production and part funding from the RSPB, World Wide Fund for Nature and Open University. It was filmed over three years in 145 locations across the British Isles. 

The Guardian reported ahead of the series' start that a sixth episode would not be broadcast due to a fear of backlash from Conservatives and right-wing media over its themes of destruction of nature. However, the BBC responded that Wild Isles was always planned as a 5-part series, and that the 'sixth episode' was a standalone feature called Saving Our Wild Isles to be released online.

Episodes

References 

2023 British television series debuts
2023 British television series endings
2020s British documentary television series
David Attenborough
BBC Television shows
Documentary films about nature
BBC high definition shows
BBC television documentaries
English-language television shows
Television series by BBC Studios
Television series about the United Kingdom